The Siam 7x is an Android dual-screen smartphone which launched in December 2015 and was designed by Darius Allen. This phone was the first phone produced by CRBT Siam, and the first dual-screen phone to be marketed to American consumers.

History 
Several manufacturers, including Samsung, LG and Kyocera had made attempts to create a dual-screen smartphone. However, they proved unsuccessful as their second screens were located within a difficult to access clam-shell design. The Siam 7x overcame this by placing the second screen on the outside, using a black and white E Ink Corporation screen to conserve power. A similar design was created by Yotaphone but its parent company targeted this phone to European, Asian and Middle Eastern markets. The Siam 7x was the first dual-screen phone designed for the North American market.

The phone was available only with the Android operating system, and only as a GSM carrier phone. It allows users to insert two SIM cards simultaneously. The phone was designed in Dallas, and manufactured in Shenzhen, China.

Hardware

 Processor: MTK6735A, Quad-Core Cortex A53
 GPU: ARM MaliT760-MP3@450 MHz
 Hard-drive: 1664GB
 RAM: 2GB
 Operating System: Android 5.1
 Screen Size: 5.0" 1280 x 720 HD IPS 2.5D

Furthermore the phone has a bio-metric ear print recognition system which employs the Descartes Bio-metric Helix system

Reception
The Siam 7x dual-screen smartphone was released to the public on November 27, 2015, (Black Friday). 10,000 of these phones were produced for its release date, targeting a relatively small sales volume.

References

External links
Official page

Android (operating system) devices
Smartphones
Mobile phones introduced in 2015
Electronic paper technology
Dual screen phone